Pikeville is a city in and the county seat of Pike County, Kentucky, United States. During the 2020 U.S. Census, the population within Pikeville's city limits was 7,754.
In Kentucky's current city classification system, Pikeville is a home rule-class city, a category that includes all of the state's more than 400 cities except for the two largest, Louisville and Lexington.

History

Public disapproval of the site led a new decision on December 24, 1823, to establish the county seat on land donated by local farmer Elijah Adkins. This settlement was established as the town of Pike after the county in 1824. This was changed in 1829 to Piketon and the town was incorporated under that name in 1848. In 1850, this was changed to the present Pikeville. Pikeville was host to a part of the Hatfield-McCoy feud, and patriarch Randall McCoy as well as his wife and daughter are buried on a hillside overlooking the town.

The National Civic League designated Pikeville as an All-American City in 1965.

From 1973 to 1987, the Pikeville Cut-Through was constructed immediately west of downtown. The project alleviated traffic congestion in downtown and eliminated flooding by rerouting the Levisa Fork River.

From 1982 to 1984, Pikeville was home to the Pikeville Cubs and Pikeville Brewers. Pikeville played as a member of the Rookie level Appalachian League. Pikeville was an affiliate of the Milwaukee Brewers (1982) and Chicago Cubs (1983–1984). Baseball Hall of Fame member Greg Maddux played for the 1984 Pikeville Cubs in his first professional season.

The city has been a center of rapid development in Eastern Kentucky since the 1990s. Pikeville College (now the University of Pikeville) opened the Kentucky College of Osteopathic Medicine in 1997. The university also opened the Kentucky College of Optometry, the first optometry school in Central Appalachia, in the fall of 2016. In October 2005, the 7,000 seat, multi-purpose Appalachian Wireless Arena opened in downtown. Pikeville Medical Center has established itself as a regional healthcare center. In 2014, a new 11-story clinic and a 10-story parking structure was completed at a cost of $150 million. The hospital has also become a member of the Mayo Clinic Care Network. In 2013, construction began on a shopping center known as Pikeville Commons. The first stores opened in the shopping center in October 2014.

Late 2017 saw several announcements regarding tenants for the recently opened Kentucky Enterprise Industrial Park. Following an announcement on October 27, 2017, construction has begun on a 60,000 square foot manufacturing facility to be owned and operated by SilverLiner, whose primary business is expected to be the manufacture and assembly of tanks for tanker trucks. 

In September 2018, Pikeville's City government was named 2018 KLC City Government of the Year by the Kentucky League of Cities. This was the inaugural year for the award and was intended to recognize "a city that has done something transformational and our first ever recipient certainly demonstrates a city making a huge impact on its region."

Geography
Pikeville is located at  (37.477094, −82.530111). As of March 2009, Pikeville set its new city limits to be 0.3-mile from its county line. This significantly affected the city of Coal Run Village, which was previously on the city limit of Pikeville.

The city is located in the Appalachian Mountains, along the Levisa Fork of the Big Sandy River. The downtown area is built in a narrow valley in a bend of the Levisa Fork that was bypassed in 1987 with the completion of the Pikeville Cut-Through, while places such as Weddington Square Plaza are built in a broader part of the river valley.

Climate
Pikeville has a humid subtropical climate, abbreviated "Cfa" on climate maps.

Demographics

As of the 2020 United States Census, there were 7,754 people living in the city. The racial makeup of the city was 93.8% White, 2.9% Black, 0.5% Native American, 1.3% Asian alone, 0.0% Pacific Islander, 1.5% from two or more races, and 2.2% Hispanic or Latino. 

As of the census of 2000, there were 6,295 people, 2,705 households, and 1,563 families living in the city. The racial makeup of the city was 94.58% White, 2.64% African American, 0.17% Native American, 1.25% Asian, 0.05% Pacific Islander, 0.25% from other races, and 1.05% from two or more races. Hispanic or Latino of any race were 1.40% of the population.

There were 2,763 households, out of which 29.7% had children under the age of 18 living with them, 41.0% were married couples living together, 14.5% had a female householder with no husband present, and 42.2% were non-families. 39.0% of all households were made up of individuals, and 16.3% had someone living alone who was 65 years of age or older. The average household size was 2.14 and the average family size was 2.88.

In the city, the population was spread out, with 22.2% under the age of 18, 12.9% from 18 to 24, 27.9% from 25 to 44, 21.5% from 45 to 64, and 15.4% who were 65 years of age or older. The median age was 36 years. For every 100 females, there were 85.5 males. For every 100 females age 18 and over, there were 78.1 males.

The median income for a household in the city was $22,026, and the median income for a family was $36,792. Males had a median income of $42,298 versus $19,306 for females. The per capita income for the city was $21,426. About 21.2% of families and 25.4% of the population were below the poverty line, including 36.7% of those under age 18 and 15.8% of those age 65 or over.

Education
Those schools located within the Pikeville city limits include an asterisk. The remainder are located within Pike County and are part of the Pike County Public School System, but outside of the city limits.

Elementary schools
 *Pikeville Elementary School
 *St. Francis of Assisi School
 Christ Central School
 Myra Christian Academy
 Mullins Elementary School
 Millard Elementary School
 Dorton Elementary School
 Johns Creek Elementary School
 Elkhorn City Elementary School
 Kimper Elementary School
 Bevins Elementary School
 Feds Creek Elementary School
 Northpoint Academy
 Phelps Day Treatment Center
 Phelps Elementary School
 Shelby Valley Day Treatment Center
 Belfry Elementary School
 Valley Elementary School

Middle schools
 *Pikeville Jr. High School
 Belfry Middle School
 Valley Middles School
 Dorton Middle School
 Phelps Middle School
 Johns Creek School
 Mullins Middle School
 Elkhorn City Middle School
 Feds Creek Middle School
 Millard Middle School
 Kimper Middle School

High schools
Five high schools are served by the Pikeville post office, but only Pikeville High is located within the city limits.
 *Pikeville High School — part of the Pikeville Independent Schools, whose district covers the city proper
 Belfry High School — part of the Pike County Public School System
 Pike County Central High School — part of the Pike County Public School System
Phelps High School — part of the Pike County Public School System
 Shelby Valley High School — part of the Pike County Public School System
 East Ridge High School — part of the Pike County Public School System

Colleges
 University of Pikeville, a private 4-year institution affiliated with the Presbyterian Church (USA), is located in Pikeville. The college is one of the smallest in the nation to have an osteopathic medicine program as part of its curriculum. Founded in May 1996, the University of Pikeville Kentucky College of Osteopathic Medicine is one of three medical schools in the state of Kentucky.
National College
 Big Sandy Community and Technical College

Library
A pack horse library was established for library services in the late 1930s and early 1940s.

Pikeville has a lending library, a branch of the Pike County Public Library.

Arts and culture

Hillbilly Days is an annual festival held in mid-April in Pikeville, Kentucky celebrating the best of Appalachian culture. The event began by local Shriners as a fundraiser to support the Shriners Children's Hospital. It has grown since its beginning in 1976 and now is the second largest festival held in the state of Kentucky. Artists and craftspeople showcase their talents and sell their works on display. Nationally renowned musicians as well as the best of the regional mountain musicians share six different stages located throughout the downtown area of Pikeville. Want-to-be hillbillies from across the nation compete to come up with the wildest Hillbilly outfit. Fans of "mountain music" come from around the United States to hear this annual concentrated gathering of talent. The festival embraces the area's culture and past through company, music, and costume. The proceeds from the festival go to Shriners Hospitals for Children. The festival serves to honor and recognize the heritage of Appalachia, while poking fun at the stereotype associated with the region.

In the fall of 2005 the Appalachian Wireless Arena opened in downtown Pikeville. The center, which seats 7,000, features numerous events including world-renowned concerts and shows. The city is also home to the Pikeville Concert Association which secures renowned cultural events for the area. These events usually take place at Booth Auditorium on the campus of the University of Pikeville.

The Appalachian Center for the Arts is a 200-seat indoor professional theater located in downtown Pikeville.  

The Hatfield and McCoy River Trails, located on the Levisa Fork River, opened on April 26, 2014. 

Alltech of Lexington completed construction of a distillery, brewery and visitors center known as Dueling Barrels Brewery & Distillery which opened in downtown in 2018. The name was inspired by the Hatfield-McCoy Feud, and the tour includes story tellers describing those events in addition to an explanation of the brewing and distilling processes.

Sister cities
  Ankang, Shaanxi, China
  Dundalk, Ireland
 Doylestown, Pennsylvania

Notable people
Woody Blackburn, professional golfer
Robert Damron, professional golfer
Murray Garvin, basketball head coach, South Carolina State University men's basketball
Ryan Hall, American YouTuber, and Internet personality
Patty Loveless, country music singer
John W. Langley, American politician
Katherine G. Langley, American politician
Jerry Layne, MLB umpire
Randolph (Randall) McCoy, Patriarch of McCoy family during the Hatfield-McCoy Feud
Mark Reynolds, baseball player for Colorado Rockies
John Paul Riddle, self taught aviator and co-founder of Embry–Riddle Aeronautical University
Jack Smith, baseball player for Los Angeles Dodgers
Effie Waller Smith, poet
Preston Spradlin, basketball head coach, Morehead State
Jonny Venters, baseball player for Washington Nationals
Dwight Yoakam, country singer-songwriter, actor, and film director

See also

 Hillbilly Days
 Pikeville Cut-Through
 Pike County Airport
 Pikeville High School
 University of Pikeville
 Pikeville Medical Center
 Eastern Kentucky Expo Center
 Big Sandy Heritage Center
 East Kentucky Miners

References

Further reading

External links
City website
City Tourism website
City Economic Development website
University of Pikeville
Appalachian News-Express
Pikeville Independent Schools

1823 establishments in Kentucky
Cities in Kentucky
Cities in Pike County, Kentucky
County seats in Kentucky
Eastern Kentucky Coalfield
Populated places established in 1823